Mundat may be,

Mundat Forest of Europe
Mundat language of Nigeria